NGC 821 is an elliptical galaxy in the constellation Aries. It is estimated to be about 80 million light-years from the Milky Way and has a diameter of approximately 55,000 light years. NGC 821 was discovered on September 4, 1786 by astronomer Wilhelm Herschel.

See also 
 List of NGC objects (1–1000)

References

External links 
 

Elliptical galaxies
Aries (constellation)
0821
008160